The Basilica of Saint Praxedes, commonly known in Italian as Santa Prassede, is an early medieval titular church and minor basilica located near the papal basilica of Saint Mary Major, on Via di Santa Prassede, 9/a in rione Monti of Rome, Italy. The current Cardinal Priest of Titulus Sancta Praxedis is Paul Poupard.

Dedicated to the second-century saint Praxedes, who with her sister Pudentiana, was said to have provided comfort and care to Christians persecuted in the Roman Empire.

History 
The church incorporates mosaic decoration that mark it among the oldest churches in Rome. A church near this site was present since the fifth century, but the church in its current place and general layout was commissioned by Pope Hadrian I around the year 780 to house the relics (bones) of Saint Praxedes and Saint Pudentiana, the daughters of Saint Pudens, traditionally St. Peter's first Christian convert in Rome. The church was built atop of the remains of a 4th-century ancient Roman Thermae, privately owned by the family of Pudentiana, and called Terme di Novato. The two female saints were murdered for providing Christian burial for early martyrs in defiance of Roman law. The basilica was enlarged and decorated by Pope Paschal I in c. 822.

Pope Paschal, who reigned 817–824, was at the forefront of the Carolingian Renaissance started and advocated by the emperor Charlemagne. They desired to get back to the foundations of Christianity theologically and artistically. Paschal, thus, began two, linked, ambitious programs: the recovery of martyrs' bones from the catacombs of Rome and an almost unprecedented church building campaign. Paschal dug up numerous skeletons and transplanted them to this church. The Titulus S. Praxedis was established by Pope Evaristus, around 112. While on a pilgrimage to Rome with his father around 855-856, the young and future English king Alfred the Great was reportedly deeply impressed and inspired by the church's beauty.

The inscriptions found in Santa Prassede, a valuable source illustrating the history of the church, have been collected and published by Vincenzo Forcella.

The church contains the oratory of San Zenone.

The church provided the inspiration for Robert Browning's poem "The Bishop Orders His Tomb at Saint Praxed's Church."

Interior 
The main altarpiece is a canvas of St Praxedes Gathering the Blood of the Martyrs (c. 1730–35) by Domenico Muratori.

Mosaic 

The most famous element of the church is the mosaic decorative program. Paschal hired a team of professional mosaicists to complete the work in the apse, the apsidal arch, and the triumphal arch. In the apse, Jesus is in the center, flanked by Sts. Peter and Paul who present Prassede and Pudenziana to God. On the far left is Paschal, with the square halo of the living, presenting a model of the church as an offering to Jesus. Below runs an inscription of Paschal's, hoping that this offering will be sufficient to secure his place in heaven.

On the apsidal arch are twelve men on each side, holding wreaths of victory, welcoming the souls into heaven. Above them are symbols of the four Gospel writers: Mark, the lion; Matthew, the man; Luke, the bull; and John, the eagle, as they surround a lamb on a throne, a symbol of Christ's eventual return to Earth.

Those  mosaics, as well as those in the Chapel of Saint Zeno, a funerary chapel which Pope Paschal built for his mother, Theodora, are the best-known aspects of the church. Also noteworthy are ancient frescoes. Ascending a spiral staircase, one enters a small room, covered in scaffolding;  on the wall is a fresco cycle, dating most likely from the 8th century. The frescoes probably depict  the life-cycle of the name saint of the church, Praxedes.

Pillar of the Flogging 

Santa Prassede also houses an alleged segment of the pillar or column upon which Jesus  was flogged and tortured before his crucifixion in Jerusalem. The relic is alleged to have been discovered in the early 4th century by Saint Helena (mother of the Roman Emperor Constantine I) who at the age of 80 undertook a pilgrimage to the Holy Land, where she founded churches for Christian worship and rescued relics associated with the crucifixion of Jesus on Calvary. In 1223, Cardinal Giovanni Colonna, as emissary to the holy land in 1223 was said to have obtained this artifact and brought it to Rome.

Among these legendary relics retrieved by Helena, which included pieces of the True Cross (now venerated at St. Peter's Basilica with fragments in Santa Croce in Gerusalemme, also in Rome) and wood from the Jesus' crib enshrined at S. Maria Maggiore. These items, including the Santa Prassede pillar, lack indisputable authenticity, due to absence of forensic evidence and the abundance of other objects claimed during the medieval period to have the same historic function.

List of cardinals

 Benedict, under Pope Gregory VII (1073–1085)
 Deodatus (1091), appointee of Antipope Clement III
 Romanus (1105–1112)
 Lambert  (1112–1115)
 Desiderius (1115–1138)
 Chrysogonus (1138–1141)
 Hubald of Lucca (1141–1158)
 William (1173)
 Radulfus Nigellus (1188)
 Rufinus (1190–1192)
 Soffred of Pistoia (1193–1210)
 Giovanni da Ferentino (1212–1217)
 Giovanni Colonna di Carbognano (1217–1245)
 Ancher Pantaleon (1262–1286)
 Pedro Gómez de Barroso (1327–1341)
 Gilles Riguad (1350–1353)
 Marco da Viterbo (1366–1369)
 Pedro Gómez de Barroso Albornoz (1371–1374)
 Pietro Pileo di Prata (1378–1384)
 Tommaso Ammanati (1385–1396), loyal to the Avignon Papacy
 Pedro Fernández de Frías (1405–1412), loyal to the Avignon and Pisa papacies
 Antonio Calvi (1405–1409) 
 Raimond Mairose (1426–1427)
 Jean Le Jeune (1440–1441)
 Alain de Coëtivy (1448–1465); in commendam (1465–1474)
 Giovanni Arcimboldo (1476–1488)
 Antoniotto Pallavicini (1489–1503)
 Gabriele de’ Gabrielli (1507–1511)
 Christopher Bainbridge (1511–1514)
 Antonio Maria Ciocchi del Monte (1514–1521)
 Ippolito de’ Medici (1529–1532)
 Tommaso De Vio (1534)
 Francesco Cornaro (1535–1541)
 Philippe de la Chambre (1541–1542)
 Gasparo Contarini (1542)
 Giovanni Maria Ciocchi del Monte (1542–1543)
 Miguel de Silva (1543–1552)
 Cristoforo Ciocchi del Monte (1552–1564)
 Charles Borromeo (1564–1584)
 Nicolas de Pellevé (1584–1594)
 Alessandro Ottaviano de’ Medici (1594–1600)
 Simeone Tagliavia d’Aragona (1600)
 Antonio Maria Galli (1600–1605)
 Ottavio Acquaviva d’Aragona (1605–1612)
 Bartolomeo Cesi (1613–1620)
 Roberto Bellarmino (1620–1621)
 François d’Escoubleau de Sourdis (1621–1628)
 Marcello Lante (1628–1629)
 Roberto Ubaldini (1629–1635)
 Guido Bentivoglio (1635–1639)
 Giulio Roma (1639–1644)
 Ernst Adalbert von Harrach (1644–1667)
 Giulio Gabrielli (1667)
 Virginio Orsini (1667–1668)
 Alderano Cybo-Malaspina (1668–1677)
 Pietro Vito Ottoboni (1680–1681)
 Francesco Albizzi (1681–1684)
 Decio Azzolini der Jüngere (1684–1689)
 Giulio Spinola (1689–1691)
 Francesco Maidalchini (1691–1700)
 Galeazzo Marescotti (1700–1708)
 Fabrizio Spada (1708–1710)
 Bandino Panciatichi (1710–1718)
 Francesco Barberini, Jr. (1718–1721)
 Giuseppe Sacripante (1721–1726)
 Filippo Antonio Gualterio (1726–1728)
 Lodovico Pico della Mirandola (1728–1731)
 Antonio Felice Zondadari (1731–1737)
 Giorgio Spinola (1737–1738)
 Luis Belluga y Moncada (1738–1743)
 Angelo Maria Quirini OSBCas (1743–1755)
 Domenico Silvio Passionei (1755–1759)
 Giacomo Oddi (1759–1763)
 Carlo Vittorio Amedeo delle Lanze (1763–1783)
 Vitaliano Borromeo (1783–1793)
 Francesco Saverio de Zelada (1793–1801)
 Antonio Dugnani (1801–1807)
 Carlo Antonio Giuseppe Bellisomi (1807–1808)
 vacant (1808–1814)
 Giovanni Filippo Gallarati Scotti (1814–1818); in commendam (1818–1819)
 vacant (1819–1823)
 Francesco Serlupi Crescenzi (1823–1828)
 Antonio Domenico Gamberini (1829–1839); in commendam (1839–1841)
 Paolo Polidori (1841–1847)
 Luigi Vannicelli Casoni (1847–1877)
 Edoardo Borromeo (1878–1881)
 Angelo Bianchi (1883–1889)
 Tommaso Maria Zigliara (1891–1893)
 Gaetano Aloisi Masella (1893–1902)
 Rafael Merry del Val y Zulueta (1903–1930)
 Raffaele Carlo Rossi (1930–1948)
 vacant (1948–1953)
 Pietro Ciriaci (1953–1964)
 Owen McCann (1965–1994)
 Paul Poupard (since 1996)

Gallery
.

See also 
 Episcopa Theodora

References

Bibliography
 B. M. Apollonj Ghetti, Santa Prassede (Roma: Edizioni Roma, 1961).
 Gillian Vallance Mackie, The Iconographic Programme of the Zeno Chapel at Santa Prassede, Rome [M.A. University of Victoria (B.C., Canada) 1985].
 Marchita B. Mauck,  “The Mosaic of the Triumphal Arch of Santa Prassede: A Liturgical Interpretation.” Speculum 62–64 (1987), pp. 813–828.
 Rotraut Wisskirchen, Mosaikprogramm von Santa Prassede in Rom (Münster: Aschendorff, 1990).
 Anna Maria Affanni, La chiesa di Santa Prassede: la storia, il rilievo, il restauro (Viterbo: BetaGamma, [2006]) [Testimonianze di restauri, 5]. 
 Mary M. Schaefer, Women in Pastoral Office: The Story of Santa Prassede, Rome (New York, NY: Oxford University Press, 2013).
 Maurizio Caperna, La basilica di Santa Prassede: il significato della vicenda architettonica (Roma: Edizioni Quasar, 2013).
 Benedictine Monks of Vallombroso, The Basilica of Saint Praxedes, in memory of their eighth century of presence at Saint Praxedes: 1198–1998 (Genova, Italia: B.N. Marconi, Fourth Edition, January 2014).

External links 
 Kunsthistorie.com, photogallery.
Santa Prassede Mosaics
High-resolution 360° Panoramas and Images of Santa Prassede | Art Atlas

Religious buildings and structures completed in 822
9th-century churches in Italy
Prassede
Prassede
Byzantine art
Articles containing video clips
Prassede
9th-century establishments in Italy